Pontus Karl Johan Lidberg is a Swedish born choreographer, dancer and filmmaker. He is the Artistic Director of Danish Dance Theatre in Copenhagen, Denmark.

Early life and education 
Born in Stockholm, Sweden to psychiatrist Lars Lidberg and psychologist Yvonne Lidberg, Lidberg began classical ballet training at the age of four. He has a M.F.A. in contemporary performative arts from the University of Gothenburg, Academy of Music and Drama, Sweden.

Choreographer
Lidberg has created works for dance companies including Paris Opera Ballet, New York City Ballet, Les Ballets de Monte Carlo, Dresden Semperoper Ballett, Royal Swedish Ballet, Le Ballet du Grand Théâtre de Genève, Morphoses, Balletboyz, Acosta Danza and the Royal Danish Ballet. as well as for his own company Pontus Lidberg Dance. Pontus Lidberg Dance has been presented at venues such as The Joyce Theater, New York, The Havana International Ballet Festival and the National Arts Center of Canada. His work Siren opened the 38th Festival Oriente-Occidente in Rovereto, Italy.

In 2016 he was commissioned by Library of Congress to create a new work for the Martha Graham Dance Company, as the centerpiece for a celebration marking the Library’s 90th anniversary as a presenter of the performing arts.

Lidberg has been Artist-in-Residence at Harvard, Headlands Center for the Arts, Baryshnikov Arts Center, a choreography fellow at New York City Center, and a fellow at the Center for Ballet and the Arts at New York University. He received a 2019 John Simon Guggenheim Fellowship in Choreography.

Filmmaker
In 2007, Lidberg directed The Rain, a film featuring Alicia Vikander that takes place in a ceaseless rainfall. The New York Times wrote: "Memorably The Rain illustrates what filmed dance can say that staged dance cannot".

His subsequent film Labyrinth Within, featured Lidberg himself, former New York City Ballet principal dancer Wendy Whelan and Giovanni Bucchieri. It won the 2012 Jury Prize for Best Picture at the Dance on Camera Festival in New York City. During his 2012 tenure as resident artistic director of Morphoses, Lidberg developed the film into an hourlong work of live performance and film titled Within (Labyrinth Within), premiering at the 2012 Jacob’s Pillow Dance Festival.

Filming began in Paris in 2019 on Written on Water, his third film, after a successful Kickstarter fundraising of £30,835. Starring Aurélie Dupont, Alexander Jones and Pontus himself, it will be a 75-minute dance film about an artist whose happy and comfortable married life is upended when she unexpectedly falls in love with someone else. Written on Water aims to convey the drama of desire and the turmoil of the protagonist’s inner life through dance, evocative cinematography, and music.

Works
 Les Noces, Paris Opera Ballet (2019)
 Siren, Pontus Lidberg Dance and Danish Dance Theatre (2018)
 Paysage, Soudain, La Nuit, Acosta Danza (2018)
 Une Autre Passion, Le Ballet du Grand Théâtre de Genève (2017)
 The Shimmering Asphalt, New York City Ballet (2017)
 Woodland, Martha Graham Dance Company (2016)
 Rabbit, Balletboyz (2016)
 Summer’s Winter Shadow, Les Ballets de Monte Carlo (2015)
 Little Match Girl Passion, Westminster College Choir (2015)
 Untitled, American Ballet Theater Studio Company (2015)
 SNOW, Pontus Lidberg Dance (2013, revised 2015)
 Raymonda, Royal Swedish Ballet (2014)
 Im Anderen Raum, Semperoper Ballett Dresden (2013)
 Stream, Oregon Ballet Theatre (2013)
 Giselle, Ballet du Grand Théâtre de Genève (2012)
 Within (Labyrinth Within), Morphoses (2012)
 Faune, Pontus Lidberg Dance (2011)
 Vespertine, Morphoses (2010)
 Warriors, Pontus Lidberg Dance (2010)
 Exit, Pursued by a Bear, Royal Danish Ballet (2010)
 Luminous, Beijing Dance Theatre (2009)
 Tactile Affinity, Stockholm 59° North: Soloists of The Royal Swedish Ballet (2009)
 Heart of Silk, Skånes Dansteater (2009)
 Transformations, NorrDans (2008)
 Metamorphose one, Morphoses the Wheeldon Company (2008)
 Light in a Night's Coat, Norwegian National Ballet (2005)
 Duet for Dancer and Pianist, Pontus Lidberg Dance (2004)

References

External links
Official website
Pontus Lidberg Vimeo

Ballet choreographers
Contemporary dance choreographers
Contemporary dancers
Swedish film directors
1977 births
Living people